Leri's pleonosteosis is a rare rheumatic condition. It was first described by the French physician Leri in 1921.

Presentation

The clinical features of this condition include
 Flattened facial features
 Flexion contractures of the interphalangeal joints of hand and foot.
 Limited motion of multiple joints
 Short broad metacarpals, metatarsals and phalanges

Thickening of the skin may occur in a fashion similar to that occurs in scleroderma. The thumbs may be angled in a lateral direction (valgus deformity). The knees may be angled backwards (genu recurvatum). Abnormalities of the upper spinal cord may also occur.

Genetics

It is inherited in an autosomal dominant fashion.The pathogenesis of this condition appears to be due to over expression of two genes - GDF6 and SDC2. These genes are located on the long arm of chromosome 8(8q22.1).

Diagnosis

Treatment

References

Rheumatology